The Canadian Vickers Varuna was a Canadian flying boat of the 1920s built by Canadian Vickers as a twin-engined, unequal-span biplane, with a wooden hull and steel tube structure.

Design and development
The Varuna was developed in response to a Royal Canadian Air Force requirement for a flying boat to transport men and equipment to forest fires. It was a large-scale twin-engined version of the Vedette.

Operational history
Most Varunas spent their service in Manitoba operating in their intended role; all Varuna IIs were withdrawn in 1930 and the sole Varuna I was struck off in 1932

Variants
 Varuna I - with Wright J-6 Whirlwind radial engines, one built.
 Varuna II - with Armstrong Siddeley Lynx IV radial engines.

Specifications (Varuna II)

References

External links

1920s Canadian military transport aircraft
Flying boats
Varuna
Biplanes
Twin piston-engined tractor aircraft